Hieroglyphics, also known as the Hieroglyphics Crew and Hiero, is an American underground hip hop collective based in Oakland, California. The collective was founded in the early-1990s by rapper Del the Funky Homosapien. The collective is currently composed of rappers Del the Funky Homosapien, Casual, Pep Love,  producer/manager Domino, DJ Toure, and the four individual members of the rap group Souls of Mischief: Phesto, A-Plus, Opio, and Tajai.

Since their inception, Hieroglyphics have found a following largely through their live concerts, podcasts ("Hierocasts"), and promotion through their website.

The collective uses a three-eyed, straight-lipped face logo that figures prominently on their albums, website, stickers, and clothing.

History
As a collective, the Hieroglyphics have released three studio albums: 3rd Eye Vision in 1998, Full Circle in 2003, and The Kitchen in 2013.

In 2005, the collective released a live DVD and accompanying CD of the Hiero's 2003 Full Circle Tour.

The collective has also released five compilation albums:  Hiero B-Sides and Hiero Oldies Vol. I in 1997, Hiero Oldies Vol. II in 1998, The Building in 2004, The Corner in 2005, and most recently, Over Time, in March 2007.

Individual members of the collective have also released albums of their own, either through solo projects or outside group projects.

Logo 
The collective's third eye logo is the Mayan numeral for 8. Created by Del the Funky Homosapien, the son of an abstract artist, it has been used to promote the collective on their album covers, website, stickers, clothing, and other promotional materials.

In a 2000 interview with SF Weekly, Del commented:     
 
The Clerks comic in question was drawn by underground comic artist Jim Mahfood who has worked various rap and hip hop items into his work over his career. In an interview with halftimeonline.net in 2004, Mahfood mentioned Del and the Hieroglyphics by name:

Discography

Studio albums

Live albums

Compilation albums

Singles

As featured artist

References

External links
 

Musical collectives
Alternative hip hop groups
Hip hop groups from California
Hip hop collectives
Musical groups established in 1995
Musical groups from Oakland, California